Mikail Darrehsi (also Romanized as Mīkā'īl Darrehsī and Mīkā’īl Darrasī) is a village in Pain Barzand Rural District, Anguti District, Germi County, Ardabil Province, Iran. At the 2006 census, its population was 90, in 18 families.

References 

Towns and villages in Germi County